Tatyana Romanovna Lebedeva (born 21 July 1976) is a Russian track and field athlete who competes in both the long jump and triple jump events. She is one of the most successful athletes in the disciplines, having won gold medals at Olympic, world and European levels. She has a long jump best of 7.33 m and held the then indoor world record mark of 15.36 m in the triple jump. In 2017 she was banned for doping.

Career
Her first successes came in the triple jump in 2000, when she won European Indoor gold medal and a silver at the 2000 Sydney Olympics. She became the World Champion the following year in addition to a silver medal at the world indoors. After retaining her triple jump title at the 2003 World Championships, she decided to take up the long jump as well. The move paid dividends: she broke the indoor world record in the triple jump at the 2004 World Indoor Championships and won a second gold in the long jump with a mark of 15.36. She won her first Olympic gold medal in the long jump event at the 2004 Athens Olympics and also won the bronze in the triple jump competition.

In 2005, she missed the World Championships due to injury, but became the sole winner of the IAAF Golden League jackpot, a bonus of US$1 million awarded to athletes who win their event at each of six designated European summer meets. That year, she concentrated on the triple jump.

Lebedeva excelled at the 2005 IAAF Golden League, receiving the entire jackpot prize of US$1 million. She became European champion for the first time with a win at the 2006 European Athletics Championships in the triple jump. Lebedeva reached the podium twice at the 2007 World Championships taking long jump gold and triple jump silver.

On 25 January 2017, the International Olympic Committee sanctioned Lebedeva for doping at the 2008 Olympic Games, as a result she lost her silver medals for both the long jump and triple jump events in that Games. Lebedeva appealed the IOC's decision to the Court of Arbitration for Sport, however on 26 July 2018, the IOC's decision was upheld.

She won the long jump silver medal at the 2009 World Championships (her eighth medal on the world podium), although she could not match this form in the triple jump.

Personal life
In September 2002, Lebedeva and her husband Nikolay Matveev had their first daughter, Anastasiya. She announced that she was pregnant for a second time in 2010 (choosing to skip the 2011 season), and gave birth to a second daughter (Aleksandra) in November.

Personal bests

All information taken from IAAF profile.

International competitions

National titles
Russian Athletics Championships
Long jump: 2004
Triple jump: 1998, 1999, 2000, 2001
Russian Indoor Athletics Championships
Long jump: 2004
Triple jump: 2000, 2001, 2003

See also
List of doping cases in athletics
List of Olympic medalists in athletics (women)
List of 2000 Summer Olympics medal winners
List of 2004 Summer Olympics medal winners
List of 2008 Summer Olympics medal winners
List of stripped Olympic medals
List of medal sweeps in Olympic athletics
List of World Athletics Championships medalists (women)
List of medal sweeps at the World Athletics Championships
List of IAAF World Indoor Championships medalists (women)
List of European Athletics Championships medalists (women)
List of European Athletics Indoor Championships medalists (women)
List of Russian sportspeople
Long jump at the Olympics
Triple jump at the Olympics
Russia at the World Athletics Championships
Doping at the Olympic Games
Doping in Russia

References

External links

 
 Focus on Athletes – in-depth IAAF article

1976 births
Living people
People from Sterlitamak
Sportspeople from Volgograd
Russian female long jumpers
Russian female triple jumpers
Olympic female long jumpers
Olympic female triple jumpers
Olympic athletes of Russia
Olympic gold medalists for Russia
Olympic silver medalists for Russia
Olympic bronze medalists for Russia
Olympic gold medalists in athletics (track and field)
Olympic silver medalists in athletics (track and field)
Olympic bronze medalists in athletics (track and field)
Athletes (track and field) at the 2000 Summer Olympics
Athletes (track and field) at the 2004 Summer Olympics
Athletes (track and field) at the 2008 Summer Olympics
Athletes (track and field) at the 2012 Summer Olympics
Medalists at the 2000 Summer Olympics
Medalists at the 2004 Summer Olympics
Competitors stripped of Summer Olympics medals
Goodwill Games medalists in athletics
Competitors at the 1998 Goodwill Games
Competitors at the 2001 Goodwill Games
Universiade gold medalists for Russia
Universiade gold medalists in athletics (track and field)
Medalists at the 2001 Summer Universiade
World Athletics Championships athletes for Russia
World Athletics Championships winners
World Athletics Championships medalists
World Athletics Indoor Championships winners
IAAF Continental Cup winners
European Athletics Championships winners
European Athletics Championships medalists
European Athletics Indoor Championships winners
Russian Athletics Championships winners
IAAF Golden League winners
World Athletics indoor record holders
Doping cases in athletics
Russian sportspeople in doping cases
Goodwill Games gold medalists in athletics
Members of the Federation Council of Russia (after 2000)